Aloysius Valente (15 October 1926 – 23 March 2013) was a Norwegian dancer, choreographer and stage instructor. He was born in Oslo. He made his breakthrough in the performance Veslefrikk med fela, based on a traditional fairytale. This story was later basis for the first Norwegian dance film from 1953, where he played the title role. He later worked for a number of institutions, including Nationaltheatret, Den Nationale Scene, Det Norske Teatret and Den Norske Opera, and also produced television shows.

References

1926 births
2013 deaths
Entertainers from Oslo
Norwegian male dancers
Norwegian choreographers